District 8 of the Texas Senate is a senatorial district that currently serves portions of Collin and Dallas counties in the U.S. state of Texas. The current Senator from District 8 is Angela Paxton.

Election history 
Election history of District 8 from 1992.

Most recent election

2018

Previous elections

2014

2012

2010

2006

2002

2000

1996

1994

1992

District officeholders

References 

08
Collin County, Texas
Dallas County, Texas